Vafa is both a given name and a surname, common to Iranian and Azerbaijani people. Notable people with the name include:

People with the given name Vafa 
Vafa Fatullayeva (1945–1987), Azerbaijani actress
Vafa Guluzade (1940–2015), Azerbaijani diplomat
Vafa Hakhamaneshi (born 1991), Iranian footballer
Vafa Huseynova (born 1988), Azerbaijani group rhythmic gymnast

People with the surname Vafa 
Cumrun Vafa (born 1960), Iranian-American physicist
Mahmoud Khosravi Vafa (born 1953), Iranian conservative politician

See also
Victorian Amateur Football Association (VAFA)
Vafa Mortar
Vafa–Witten theorem